Juan Tusquets Terrats  (March 31, 1901 – 1998) was a Catalan priest, author of the best selling book Orígenes de la revolución española. Turned into a fierce antisemite and even fiercer antimasonic hate speaker during the Spanish Second Republic, he became one of the main disseminators of the "contubernio judeomasónico" conspiracy theory in that period.

Life and opinions
He was born into a wealthy banking family in Barcelona. His father was a descendant of Jewish bankers, a Catalan nationalist, and a friend of Francesc Cambó.

Tusquets was ordained in 1926 and noted for his piety and culture.  As a teacher in the seminary of Barcelona he was commissioned to write a book on Madame Blavatsky's theosophism. He developed 'an obsessive interest in secret societies'. By the time of the Spanish Second Republic his obsession had developed into a fierce anti-semitism and an even greater hatred of Freemasonry. He turned against Catalanism and falsely accused the Catalan leader Francesc Macia of being a Freemason. Working with another priest, Joaquim Guiu Bonastre, he built  up a network of "informants" - Freemasons who told him about lodge meetings. He contributed articles to the Carlist newspaper El Correo Catalán.

Tusquets used  The Protocols of the Elders of Zion - which drew on French, German and Russian myths in a fantastical concoction that put forward the idea that a secret Jewish government, the Elders of Zion, was plotting the destruction of Christianity -  as 'documentary' evidence for his essential thesis that the Jews were set on the destruction of Christian civilization. Their instruments would be Freemasons and Communists who would use revolution, and pornographic propaganda, and unlimited liberalism. In Spain he denounced the Second Republic and accused the Catholic president Niceto Alcalá-Zamora of being a Communist, a Jew and a Freemason.  Spain and the Catholic Church could be saved only through the destruction of Jews, Freemasons and Communists.  In his book Origenes he argued that Judaic masonry (la masoneria judaica) ran the Republic as a dictatorship and he further used the many articles he wrote  for El Correo Catalan and a series of 14 books las Sectas to attack Freemasonry, Communism and Judaism. The second volume of las Sectas included a complete translation of The Protocols and a section asserting the Jewish assault on Spain could be seen in the Republic's attitude to religion, the movement for agrarian reform and the redistribution of the great estates.

In 1933, Tusquets was invited by the international Anti-masonic Association to visit a newly established concentration camp - Dachau concentration camp. He commented they did it to show what we had to do in Spain. He claimed later to have been shocked by what he saw - 'at the time however the flow and intensity of his anti-Semitic and anti-Masonic publications did not abate.' 

Tusquets would come to have influence within the Spanish Right - and specifically over Franco  - who enthusiastically devoured his anti-Semitic and anti-Masonic diatribes.  Ramón Serrano Suñer, Franco's brother-in-law and right-hand man 1937-41 would later praise Tusquet's contribution to "the creation of the atmosphere which led to the national uprising".  Tusquets was on the periphery of the military plot against the Republic further through his links with Catalan Carlists. When Tusquets finally became a collaborator of Franco in Burgos during the Civil War, his files on alleged Freemasons would provide an important part of the organisational infrastructure of the repression.

Books 
 Masones y Pacifistas, Burgos, 1939.
 Los sin Dios en Rusia
 Ediciones antisectarias, vol. VI
 Ramón Lull, pedagogo de la Cristiandad, Consejo superior de investigaciones científicas, Instituto San José de Calasanz, 1954.
 Apports hispaniques à la philosophie chrétienne de l'Occident, with Joaquin Carreras Artau
 Orígenes de la revolución española, Editorial Vilamala, Barcelona, 1932

References

1901 births
1998 deaths
Anti-Masonry in Spain
Antisemitism in Spain
Late modern Christian antisemitism
Clergy from Barcelona
Protocols of the Elders of Zion
Roman Catholic conspiracy theorists
Spanish anti-communists
Spanish people of the Spanish Civil War (National faction)
20th-century Spanish Roman Catholic priests
Spanish conspiracy theorists